Sara Mariotto (born 7 June 1997) is an Italian professional racing cyclist, who most recently rode with UCI Women's Team .

See also
 List of 2016 UCI Women's Teams and riders

References

External links
 

1997 births
Living people
Italian female cyclists
People from Conegliano
Cyclists from the Province of Treviso